Sankuchemys is an extinct genus of side-necked turtle whose fossils had been found in the Intertrappean Formation of India during the late Cretaceous period. It was first named by Eugene S. Gaffney, Ashok Sahni, Herman Schleich, Swarn Deep Singh, and Rahul Srivastava in 2003, and contains the species Sankuchemys sethnai.

References

External links
 Sankuchemys at the Paleobiology Database

Late Cretaceous turtles of Asia
Bothremydidae
Extinct animals of India
Prehistoric turtle genera
Taxa named by Eugene S. Gaffney
Extinct turtles